Ofterdingen is a municipality in the district of Tübingen in Baden-Württemberg in Germany.

References 

Municipalities in Baden-Württemberg
Tübingen (district)